Kitty Carstairs is a 1917 novel by the British writer John Joy Bell. It was adapted into a 1928 American silent film Beyond London Lights starring Adrienne Dore.

References

Bibliography
 Goble, Alan. The Complete Index to Literary Sources in Film. Walter de Gruyter, 1999.

1917 British novels
Novels set in London
British novels adapted into films